Kohring is a surname of German origin. Notable people with the surname include:

 Matthias Kohring (born 1965), German scientist for Media and Communication studies
 Vic Kohring (1958–2022), American politician

German-language surnames